Roman Serhiyovych Talan (born 4 February 1988) is a Ukrainian former competitive pair skater. With Kateryna Kostenko, he is the 2009 Ukrainian national champion and represented Ukraine at the 2010 Winter Olympics. He competed with Elizaveta Usmantseva from 2013 to 2014.

Personal life 
Roman Talan was born in Kursk Oblast, Russian SFSR, Soviet Union. He married Kateryna Kostenko in 2011 and their daughter, also named Kateryna, was born on 25 February 2012.

Career 
Early in his career, Talan competed with Julia Goreeva. They were the 2005 Ukrainian junior silver medalists and competed twice at the World Junior Championships, finishing 11th in 2006.

Talan teamed up with Kateryna Kostenko when she was 21 years old and he 17. Gold medalists at the 2009 Ukrainian Championships, they represented their country at the 2008 and 2009 European Championships, 2010 World Championships, and 2010 Winter Olympics. They ended their competitive career in 2010 and began coaching in Dnipropetrovsk.

In February 2013, Talan teamed up with Elizaveta Usmantseva, whom he had coached earlier. Usmantseva/Talan made their debut late in the 2012–13 season, at the 2013 Coupe du Printemps. In September 2013, they finished eighth at the 2013 Nebelhorn Trophy, the last qualifying event for the 2014 Winter Olympics in Sochi. Their result gave Ukraine a spot in the Olympic pairs' event but it was assigned to Julia Lavrentieva / Yuri Rudyk. They turned down a test skate for the 2014 World Championships in order to treat Usmantseva's spinal disc herniation.

Usmantseva/Talan were assigned to replace Berton/Hotarek at the 2014 Skate America but later withdrew as well. They ended their partnership in December 2014.

Programs

With Usmantseva

With Kostenko

With Goreeva

Competitive highlights
GP: Grand Prix; CS: Challenger Series (began in the 2014–15 season); JGP: Junior Grand Prix

With Usmantseva

With Kostenko

With Goreeva

References

External links 

 
 
 

Ukrainian male pair skaters
Living people
1988 births
Sportspeople from Kursk Oblast
Olympic figure skaters of Ukraine
Figure skaters at the 2010 Winter Olympics
Competitors at the 2009 Winter Universiade